The 1570 Concepción earthquake occurred at 9:00, on February 8, 1570. The strong earthquake destroyed Concepción, Chile. It was accompanied by a tsunami, and aftershocks were felt for months. According to NOAA at least 2000 lives were lost and every house was destroyed. Because of a delay between the earthquake and the tsunami, much of the population was able to escape to higher ground. 

See also 
 List of earthquakes in Chile

References 

1570 Concepción
16th-century earthquakes
1570 in science
1570s in the Captaincy General of Chile
1570s in the Viceroyalty of Peru